The parotid duct, or Stensen duct, is a salivary duct. It is the route that saliva takes from the major salivary gland, the parotid gland, into the mouth. It opens into the mouth opposite the second upper molar tooth.

Structure
The parotid duct is formed when several interlobular ducts, the largest ducts inside the parotid gland, join. It emerges from the parotid gland. It runs forward along the lateral side of the masseter muscle for around 7 cm. In this course, the duct is surrounded by the buccal fat pad. It takes a steep turn at the border of the masseter and passes through the buccinator muscle, opening into the vestibule of the mouth, the region of the mouth between the cheek and the gums, at the parotid papilla, which lies across the second maxillary (upper) molar tooth. The exit of the parotid ducts can be felt as small bumps (papillae) on both sides of the mouth that usually positioned next to the maxillary second molar.

The buccinator acts as a valve that prevents air forcing into the duct, which would cause pneumoparotitis.

Relations 
The parotid duct lies close to the buccal branch of the facial nerve (VII). It is also close to the transverse facial artery.

Running along with the duct superiorly is the transverse facial artery, and the upper buccal nerve. The lower buccal nerve runs inferiorly along the duct.

Clinical significance 
Blockage, whether caused by salivary duct stones or external compression, may cause pain and swelling of the parotid gland (parotitis).

Koplik's spots which are pathognomonic of measles are found near the opening of the parotid duct.

The parotid duct may be cannulated by inserting a tube through the internal orifice in the mouth. Dye may be injected to allow for imaging of the parotid duct.

History
The parotid duct is named after Nicolas Steno (1638–1686), also known as Niels Stensen, a Danish anatomist (albeit best known as a geologist) credited with its detailed description in 1660. This is where the alternative name "Stensen duct" originates from.

Additional images

See also 
 Parotid gland
 Parotitis

References

Further reading

External links 
 Diagram at MSU
  - Parotid duct injuries
 

Glands of mouth
Saliva